Selim Matar, writer, novelist and sociologist with Swiss and Iraqi nationalities, was born in Bagdad and resides currently in Geneva. He is founder of the movement known as "Identity of the Iraqi Nation", chief editor of the trimestral journal Mesopotamie, as well as author of Woman of the Flask, a well known novel in the Arabic-speaking world.

Biography
Selim Matar was born in 1956 in a family that immigrated to Baghdad from the south of Iraq. He becomes member of the Iraqi communist party and leaves his country at the end of 1978, after the failure of what is known as the "national confrontation" between the ruling party Baas and the communists. After three years of ceaseless wanderings in the Middle-East, he finally settles down in Geneva at the end of 1981. He studied at the Graduate Institute of Development Studies, specializing in social sciences and research in the Third World.

The conception of national identity and that of the Iraqi nation 
In Switzerland, Selim Matar distanced himself from communism from two points: its internationalist and economic mode of thinking, which disregards national identity and cultural factors, and the materialist Marxist philosophy which denies spirituality. From being a "universalist materialist", he becomes now a "spiritual humanist", believing in cosmic forces, not by adopting any specific religion, but rather in being open to and in studying diverse beliefs from all around the world.

One of his fundamental ideas: the exterior is the reflection of the interior; every individual essence contains also the essence of the universe. Therefore, individual identity is the basis of all other forms of identity. If we do not believe in ourselves and in what surrounds us, we cannot believe in the collectivity and what lies further. Therefore, if we are not attached to our own people and own identity, we cannot be attached to humanity as a whole. It is from this philosophical starting point, as well as his numerous books (essays and novels) and his journal Mesopotamia that Selim MATAR starts to occupy himself with the concept of "national identity". In fact he is considered as the founding figure of the cultural movement known as "identity of the Iraqi nation", a concept not known in Iraq until the eighties, be it in the political or cultural domain.

The book that really founded this movement is Wounded Identity (1996, 500 pages, several Iraqi and Arab editions). This work has been studied in several Iraqi universities. The concept of identity is here explained and applied to the Iraqi case, as well as to the Near East and to the whole Arabic world, from a historical and political point of view.

Because of his pacific discourse that calls for national unity and rejection of ethnic and confessional fanaticism, Selim Matar has been contested by communitarian parties and movements leaning towards armed conflicts.

Principal books
Selim MATAR is the author of several works of reflection, essays, novels and short stories. The ensemble of his works can be consulted free of charge on his website.

List of principal books:

1. Imra’at al-Qârûra (The Woman of the Flask), 1990, 160 pages. This first book won the prize "Al-Naqed" of the best Arabic novel in 1990. It exists in several editions, both Iraqi and Arab. This novel has been very well received in the Arabic world and Selim MATAR has been named "companion of the Woman of the Flask".
This novel has been translated into French (La Femme à la Fiole) and in English (The Woman of the Flask).

2. Al-Dhât al-djarîha (Wounded Identity, 1996, 500 pages) is his first work of reflection and history. There he shows in detail, with numerous examples from history and philosophy, the concept of national identity and the problems of identity in Iraq as well as the Arabic world at large.

3. I’tirâfât radjulin lâ yastahyî (literal translation: The Confessions of a Man without Shame), 2008, 160 pages. This is an autobiographical novel where the author evokes his life from his childhood and youth in Bagdad all the way through his arrival in Geneva and his life in Switzerland. Translated into the French version at Paris in 2011 (Bagdad-Genève, à la recherche d’une patrie, roman autobiographique). Several extracts from the book have been performed in a play.

4. Al-munazammât al-sirriyah (The Secret Societies), 2011, 160 pages. This book assembles information and develops a reflection on world secret societies and their role in the Middle East.

5. Al-Irâq, saba’tu alâf 'âm min al-hayât (Iraq, 7000 Years of Living History, 2013, 260 pages). This important work combines history with reflection. It retraces different stages of Iraqi history, from the prehistoric era until the modern times, with some 500 interesting as well as useful photos, maps and numerical information.

Other books
The other writings of Selim MATAR focus on the problem of identity and belonging in their historical, psychological, political and intellectual aspects.

1. Al-taw’am al-mafqûd (The Lost Twin), 2000, 200p, his second novel tells the wanderings of a young Iraqi exile who leaves Geneva in search of his "lost twin".

2. Djadal a-huwiyyât (The Debate of Identities), 2003, 300P:.

3. Al-Irâq al-djadîd wa-l-fikr al-djadîd, (The New Iraq and the New Thought)
2001, 200P.

4. Yaqzat al-huwiyyah al-irâqiyya (The Awakening of Iraqi Identity) 2011 ;150P.

5. Mashrû' al-ihyâh al-watanî al-'irâqî (The Project of the Rebirth of the Iraqi Nation), 2012, 150P.

The journal MESOPOTAMIA and the encyclopaedias of MESOPOTAMIA

In 2004, Selim MATAR started to publish MESOPOTAMIA, a cultural journal devoted to the question of Iraqi identity, of which he is the chief editor. While publishing issues of this periodic, Selim MATAR also supervised the publication of numerous encyclopaedias (about 400 pages) of MESOPOTAMIA:

1. Khamsat alâf 'âm min al-unûtha al-'irâqiyyah (5000 Years of Iraqi Femininity), 2004: story of the Iraqi woman and presentation of eminent female personalities in ancient and contemporary Iraq.

2. Mawsû’ah al-madâ’in al’irâqiyyah (Encyclopaedia of Iraqi Cities), 2005: a work aimed at making known the geography and history of Iraqi provinces and their principal cities.

3. Khamsat alâf 'âm min al-tadayyun al-'irâqî (5000 Years of Iraqi Religiosity), 2006: a work aimed at making known the different religions and confessions of Iraq, both antique and current.

4. Mawsû’at Kirkuk qalb al-'Irâq, (Encyclopaedia of Kirkûk, the Heart of Iraq), 2008: a work aimed at making known the province of Kirkuk, its history, as well as its geographic, demographic and cultural dimensions.

5. Mawsû’at al-lughât al-'irâqiyyah (Encyclopaedia of Iraqi Languages), 2009: a contribution to the knowledge of all the languages that have flourished in Iraq, dead or living, as well as to the culture of communities that speak those languages.

6. Mawsû’at al-bî’ah al-'irâqiyyah (Encyclopaedia of Iraqi Environment), 2010: a work aimed at bringing us information about the natural environment of Iraq and the serious ecological problems that the country has faced, in order to make us aware of the limitation of the factors of industrial and military destruction and pollution.

See also

Iraqi nationalism

References

External links
Official website

1956 births
Iraqi nationalists
20th-century Iraqi novelists
Iraqi emigrants to Switzerland
Historians of Iraq
Living people
Iraqi deists
Former atheists and agnostics
21st-century Swiss historians